In chemistry and biology, the dilution ratio is the ratio of solute to solvent. It is often used for simple dilutions, one in which a unit volume of a liquid material of interest is combined with an appropriate volume of a solvent liquid to achieve the desired concentration. The diluted material must be thoroughly mixed to achieve the true dilution. For example, in a solution with a 1:5 dilution ratio, entails combining 1 unit volume of solute (the material to be diluted) with 5 unit volumes of the solvent to give 6 total units of total volume.

This is often confused with "dilution factor" which is an expression which describes the ratio of the aliquot volume to the final volume. Dilution factor is a notation often used in commercial assays. For example, in solution with a 1:5 dilution factor, entails combining 1 unit volume of solute (the material to be diluted) with (approximately) 4 unit volumes of the solvent to give 5 units of total volume. Note that some solutions and mixtures take up slightly less volume than their components.

In other areas of science such as pharmacy, and in non-scientific usage, a dilution is normally given as a plain ratio of solvent to solute.  For large factors, this confusion makes only a minor difference, but in precise work it can be important to make clear which ratio is intended.

In photographic development, dilutions are normally given in a '1+x' format. For example '1+49' would typically mean 1 part concentrate and 49 parts water, meaning a 500ml solution would require 10ml concentrate and 490ml water.

References

See also
Fraction (chemistry)
Concentration
Ternary plot

Concentration indicators
Ratios